MV Xin Xiang Rui is a bulk carrier conducting cargo runs mostly in East Asia, China and Australia-Pacific. She was previously named Elisabeth Oldendorff and Xin Xiang Ruidvy.

She was built in 1992 by Saiki Heavy Industries in Japan for the Oldendorff shipping company. She was sold in 2004 and acquired at some point by Investeringsgruppen Danmark A/S. Her present owner is Yang Pu Zhe Hai Shipping, Shanghai, China.

References

1992 ships
Merchant ships of China
Bulk carriers
Ships built in Japan